Alexander, Prince of Erbach-Schönberg (12 September 1872 –18 October 1944) was the 2nd Prince of Erbach-Schönberg, eldest son of Gustav, 1st Prince of Erbach-Schönberg.

Early life
Alexander was the eldest child of Gustav, Prince of Erbach-Schönberg (August 17, 1840 – January 29, 1908), and his wife, Princess Marie of Battenberg (1852–1923), daughter of Prince Alexander of Hesse and by Rhine and his morganatic wife Countess Julia Hauke. As a result of a morganatic marriage, his mother and her siblings were excluded from the succession of the Grand Duchy of Hesse, and bore the title Princes of Battenberg.

Among others, he was a first cousin of:
Alice, Princess Andrew of Greece and Denmark (1885–1969), mother of Prince Philip, Duke of Edinburgh and grandmother of Charles III of the United Kingdom.
Queen Victoria Eugenie of Spain (1887–1969), who married Alfonso XIII of Spain; great-grandmother of Felipe VI of Spain.
Queen Louise of Sweden (1889–1965), who married Gustaf VI Adolf of Sweden; stepgrandmother of Carl XVI Gustaf of Sweden.
Louis Mountbatten, 1st Earl Mountbatten of Burma (1900–1979), last Viceroy of India.

Marriage and family
Alexander married on 3 May 1900 in Arolsen, Princess Elisabeth of Waldeck and Pyrmont (1873–1961), seventh child and youngest daughter of George Victor, Prince of Waldeck and Pyrmont and Princess Helena of Nassau.

They had four children, nine grandchildren, seventeen great-grandchildren and nineteen great-great-grandchildren:
Princess Imma Gustava Marie Louise Pauline Edda Adolphine Hermine of Erbach-Schönberg (11 May 1901 – 14 March 1947) she married Hans Karl Baron von Dornberg on 31 May 1923. She remarried Captain Neil Boyd Watson McEacharn on 1 July 1940 and they were divorced in 1947. 
George Louis, Prince of Erbach-Schönberg (1 January 1903 – 27 January 1971) he married Marie-Marguerite von Deringer on 2 July 1925. They had three children, eleven grandchildren and seven great-grandchildren.
Prince William  Ernst Heinrich Alfred of Erbach-Schönberg (4 June 1904 – 27 September 1946) he married Countess Alexandra of Gortz on 4 October 1938. They had one daughter:
Princess Marianne of Erbach-Schönberg (15 December 1939 – 15 December 1939)
Princess Helena Sophie Louise Hedwig Emilie Martha of Erbach-Schönberg (8 April 1907 – 16 April 1979) she married Prince Leopold Frederick von Schaumburg-Lippe (son of Prince Frederick of Schaumburg-Lippe) on 30 April 1933. They had five children, six grandchildren and twelve great-grandchildren.

Orders and decorations
 :
 Wedding Medal of Grand Duke Ernst Ludwig and Grand Duchess Victoria Melita, 1894
 Grand Cross of the Merit Order of Philip the Magnanimous, 25 November 1901
 : Grand Cross of the Order of the Zähringer Lion
 : Kaiser Wilhelm I Memorial Medal, 22 March 1897
 : Grand Cross of the Friedrich Order, 1900
 : Grand Cross of the Order of Saint Alexander
 : Grand Cross of the Order of Prince Danilo I
 :
 Wedding Medal of Queen Wilhelmina and Duke Henry of Mecklenburg-Schwerin, 1901
 Grand Cross of the Order of the Netherlands Lion
 : Knight of the Imperial Order of Saint Prince Vladimir, 4th Class

Ancestry

Notes and sources
Genealogisches Handbuch des Adels, Fürstliche Häuser, Reference: 1956
The Royal House of Stuart, London, 1969, 1971, 1976, Addington, A. C., Reference: II 351

References

1872 births
1944 deaths
People from the Grand Duchy of Hesse
House of Erbach-Schönberg
Recipients of the Order of St. Vladimir, 4th class